Dumitru Frățilă (born 7 December 1961) is a Romanian sailor. He competed in the Finn event at the 1996 Summer Olympics.

References

External links
 

1961 births
Living people
Romanian male sailors (sport)
Olympic sailors of Romania
Sailors at the 1996 Summer Olympics – Finn
Place of birth missing (living people)